26 blocks scandal was a construction scandal in British Hong Kong during the 1980s. A total of 577 blocks of public housing estate was discovered with structural problems, of those 26 were demolished due to the imminent risk of collapse.

Events 
In March 1980, blocks 5 and 6 of Kwai Fong Estate, built only eight years prior, were found to suffer from concrete spalling. Investigations concluded that jerry-building damaged the structure of the blocks, as the strength of concrete was significantly lower than the standard. 

It is later revealed that, on 9 January 1982, the Independent Commission Against Corruption (ICAC) was told that the Kwai Fong Estate was marred by structural issues, such as concrete spalling off and water seepage from wall, with Block 6 as the most serious. 

In 1982, Block 6 underwent complete repair whilst occupants were relocated to the Tai Wo Hau Estate in the same Tsuen Wan District, costing HK$50 million. Considering the cost-ineffectiveness and that the issue was quite common at that time, the Housing Department announced in January 1985 that Block 5 would become the first government-built low-cost housing block to be demolished, marking the start of the scandal.

The Government announced on 21 November 1985 that structural problems were found in a total of 577 blocks built between 1982 and 1984 and shall be repaired. 26 housing blocks and a school building were scheduled to be demolished as soon as possible due to the risk of collapse. The Extended Redevelopment Programme was launched in the same year to clear the sub-standard blocks. Tsuen Wan New Town was the most serious, with a total of 11 blocks demolished, impacting around 78,000 residents.

The ICAC decided to launch an investigation of bribery due to the scale of the scandal. The breakthrough of the probe came in 1987 after two criminals agreed to testify as witnesses. Three contractors along with seven current and former officials were charged with bribery. Two contractors were jailed for 33 months and 3 months (received suspended sentences) respectively.

List of affected buildings

Demolished ASAP

Other affected buildings

Prosecution 
Siu Hon-sum, then 62, owner of On Lee Siu Construction Limited, faced eight charges for bribing Lam Or-shum, a worker in the Works Branch five times from February 1970 to December 1973 with a total of HK$50,000 when Ho Man Tin Estate was under construction, and a surveyor in the Work Branch in December 1968 with HK$300 when Kwai Hing Estate was being built. Siu was jailed for 33 months and fined HK$325,000.

Ho Leung, then 70, former owner of Yeu Shing Construction Company Limited, was charged with bribing Lam six times from August 1966 to 1975 with a total of more than HK$45,000 during the construction of Ngau Tau Kok Estate and Lei Muk Shue Estate. Not being charged by ICAC for health problems, Ho testified as a witness, and died in 1991.

Poon Pak-shing, former manager of Great Vast Construction Engineering Limited, faced charges over bribing Lam in 1965 and 1966 with HK$4,000 when building Upper Ngau Tau Kok Estate. Poon was handed three-month jail and suspended for a year, and fined HK$4,000.

Tam Wing-han, former deputy clerk of work in the Works Branch, was found not guilty over receiving bribery. Six government-employed worker, including four retired, were arrested but were not brought to court.

Aftermath 

The authorities graded the problematic buildings into four riskiness levels. 26 blocks, found to have imminent risk of collapse and far from the safety standard, were demolished. For the other 551 buildings, some were carried out with stabilisation works. Nevertheless, the Executive Council decided in 1987 that all Resettlement Area and Low Cost Housing blocks were to be knocked down and rebuilt by 2001. The long-term housing strategy, named Comprehensive Redevelopment Programme, was completed in 2010 upon the clearance of Lower Ngau Tau Kok (II) Estate.

References

External links 
 香港房屋委員會轄下樓宇結構勘查的經過, 程序及結果報告;香港 房屋署 ;1986
 樓宇結構勘查簡報 : 截至一九八五年十一月的情況報告;香港 房屋署  ;1986
 
 
 
 
 
 

1980s crimes in Hong Kong
Engineering failures
Independent Commission Against Corruption (Hong Kong)
Scandals in Hong Kong